McCullouch is a surname. Notable people with the surname include:

Earl McCullouch (born 1946), American football player
Gerald McCullouch (born 1967), American actor, director, and screenwriter

See also
McCulloch
McCullough